Brad Frost is the current women's ice hockey head coach at the University of Minnesota.  Since 2007, he has coached Minnesota to 4 NCAA Championships, 7 Frozen Four appearances, and 4 Western Collegiate Hockey Association (WCHA) post-season titles.

Early life
Frost was raised in Burlington, Ontario.  He graduated from Bethel University in 1996 with a bachelor's degree in Physical and Health Education.  He played as a forward on the hockey team and served as team captain for two years.  After graduation, he was an assistant coach for the Eagan (Minnesota) High School girls' team and then for the Bethel University men's team.  In June 2001, Frost joined the coaching staff at the University of Minnesota as an assistant to Laura Halldorson.  While working as an assistant coach, Minnesota won the NCAA Championships in 2004 and 2005.

Coaching career
Frost was appointed interim head coach upon Halldorson's retirement in August 2007.  He coached the team to a 27–7–4 record in the 2007–08 season and was voted WCHA Coach of the Year.  His place as head coach was made permanent on April 16, 2008.  He coached Minnesota to 62 consecutive wins between February 18, 2012 and November 16, 2013.  In that streak, Minnesota earned the 2012 NCAA title and had an undefeated season culminating in the 2013 NCAA title.  Minnesota lost in the 2014 NCAA Championship match, but won the 2015 and 2016 titles.

Head coaching record

Personal life
Frost is a Christian. Frost is married to Dayna Frost. They have three children.

References

Living people
Canadian ice hockey coaches
Ice hockey people from Ontario
Minnesota Golden Gophers women's ice hockey coaches
Sportspeople from Burlington, Ontario
Year of birth missing (living people)